= Nikos Mathesis =

Greek musician

Nikos Mathesis

Nikos Mathesis, also known as Crazy Nick, was born in Salamis, Greece, in 1907. He was a rebetiko musician. He is considered as the father of Rembetika music and the first great rembetiko lyricist. He also played a pivotal role with the record companies and was the one who brought Markos Vamvakaris into Odeon Records to record the first record featuring the bouzouki. Soon after Markos' great success, Nikos recommended the bouzouki player Yiannis Papaioannou to Columbia records. From 1931 to 1974, Nikos went on to write lyrics for all the great rembetes including, Vasilis Tsitsanis, Yiannis Papaioannou, Anestis Delias, Stellakis Perpiniadis, Giorgos Batis, Petros Kiryakos, Yorgos Papassidheris, Roza Eskenazi, Giorgos Zambetas, and Manolis Hiotis.
